John Bolton (1655–1724) was a Dean of the Church of Ireland.

Bolton educated at Trinity College, Dublin. He received the degree of Doctor of Divinity (DD). He was Dean of Derry from 1700 until his death.

References

1655 births
1724 deaths
Alumni of Trinity College Dublin
18th-century Irish Anglican priests
Deans of Derry